Pouvalu Latukefu is a Tongan former rugby union player. He played as lock.

Career
His first cap for Tonga was against Japan, in Nagoya, on 11 February 1993. Along with his ACT Kookaburras teammates Ipolito Fenukitau and Falamani Mafi, Latukefu was also part of the Tongan squad for the 1995 Rugby World Cup, where he played two matches in the tournament against Scotland in Pretoria and against Ivory Coast in Rustenburg, scoring a try in the latter. His last international cap was against Fiji in Brisbane, on 26 September 1998.

Notes

External links
Pouvalu Latukefu interanational stats 

Date of birth missing (living people)
Living people
Tongan rugby union players
Tonga international rugby union players
Tongan expatriates in Australia
1971 births
Rugby union locks